Workers Leaving The Lumière Factory in Lyon, also known as Employees Leaving the Lumière Factory and Exiting the Factory, is an 1895 French short black-and-white silent documentary film directed and produced by Louis Lumière. It is often referred to as the first real motion picture ever made, although Louis Le Prince's 1888 Roundhay Garden Scene pre-dated it by six and a half years.

Content 
Three separate versions of this film exist, which differ from one another in numerous ways-‌‌‌‌‌‌the clothing style changes demonstrating the different seasons in which they were filmed. They are often referred to as the "one horse", "two horses", and "no horse" versions, in reference to a horse-drawn carriage that appears in the first two versions (pulled by one horse in the original and two horses in the first remake). Another film with the same theme was made in 1896, that features another factory (or another entrance to the same factory) with different people.

Production
This film was made in the 35 mm format with an aspect ratio of 1.33:1, and at a speed of 16 frames per second. At that rate, the 17 meters of film length provided a duration of 46 seconds, holding a total of 800 frames.

Current status
Given its age, this short film is available to freely download from the Internet. It has also featured in a number of film collections including Landmarks of Early Film volume 1, The Movies Begin – A Treasury of Early Cinema, 1894–1913 and The Lumière Brothers' First Films.

The film has been known by a large number of alternative titles in France and the United States over the years since its production including La Sortie des Usines Lumière à Lyon-Montplaisir, Sortie de l'Usine Lumière, La Sortie des Usines, Les ouvriers et ouvrières sortant de l'Usine Lumière, Employees Leaving the Lumière Factory, Leaving the Factory, Workers Leaving the Lumière Factory, Lunch Hour at the Lumière Factory, Dinner Hour at the Factory Gate of M. Lumière at Lyon, Exiting the Factory, La Sortie des ouvriers de l'Usine Lumière.

See also

 List of films in the public domain in the United States
 Roundhay Garden Scene

References

Sources

External links

 Institut-lumiere.org, an earlier version (in very low definition) at the Institut Lumière.
 Workers Leaving the Lumière Factory All 3 versions, on YouTube
 YouTube.com, The "two horse" version.
 YouTube.com, The "no horse" version.
 

1895 films
1890s short documentary films
Black-and-white documentary films
French black-and-white films
Films set in Lyon
Films shot in Lyon
French silent short films
Films directed by Auguste and Louis Lumière
French short documentary films
Articles containing video clips